is a Japanese manga series written and illustrated by Yuna Takagi. It was serialized in Shogakukan's seinen manga magazine Hibana from March 2015 to April 2017, with its chapters collected in four tankōbon volumes. It was adapted into a Japanese television drama broadcast on Nippon TV in March 2018, followed by a live-action film that premiered in June of the same year.

Media

Manga
Dol:Men X is written and illustrated by Yuna Takagi. It was serialized in Shogakukan's seinen manga magazine Hibana from March 6, 2015 to April 7, 2017. Shogakukan collected its chapters in four tankōbon volumes, released from March 11, 2016 to July 12, 2017.

Volume list

Drama
A 4-episode Japanese television drama adaptation was broadcast on Nippon TV from March 4 to March 31, 2018.

Live-action film
A live-action film featuring the same cast and staff of the TV drama premiered on June 15, 2018. The film recounted the TV drama's story with new scenes set 15 years later.

Reception
Dol:Men X was one of the Jury Recommended Works at the 20th Japan Media Arts Festival in 2017.

References

External links
Dol:Men X official manga website at Hibana 
 
 

Comedy anime and manga
Japanese comedy films
Japanese idols in anime and manga
Live-action films based on manga
Manga adapted into films
Nippon TV dramas
Seinen manga
Shogakukan manga